The Draper site is a precontact period (late fifteenth-century) Huron-Wendat ancestral village located on a tributary of West Duffins Creek in present-day Pickering, Ontario, approximately 35 kilometres northeast of Toronto. The site is found in a wooded area on existing farmland and may be reached by walking from the end of North Road.

The Huron community on the Draper site expanded at least five times over some thirty years beginning around 1525. At its largest, it had a total of 35 longhouses that held up to 2000 people. They were located on four hectares of land, and the settlement was fortified with multiple rows of wooden palisades. The expansion of this village coincided with the abandonment of smaller villages in the area.

In the late sixteenth century, after more than a generation on the Draper site, the entire community moved five kilometres northwest to establish a new settlement, which archeologists have named the Mantle Site. The latter is located in the southeast corner of present-day Stouffville. It is the largest Wendat ancestral village excavated to date.

The same community was formerly thought to have left the Mantle site circa 1550 to establish the so-called Ratcliff site and the Aurora or Old Fort site to the north-west in what is today the Town of Whitchurch-Stouffville. New analysis in 2018 established that the Mantle site was active from 1587 to 1623.

In early 1975 and 1978, the largely undisturbed Draper Huron village site was completely excavated. This archeological work was to explore and salvage artifacts and evidence in preparation for the destruction of the site during the construction of the Pickering Airport.

Further reading
 Birch, Jennifer. "Rethinking the Archeological Application of Iroquoian Kinship," Canadian Journal of Archeology 32 (2008), 194–213.
 Birch, Jennifer. Coalescent Communities Iroquoian Ontario. PhD Dissertation, Dept. of Anthropology, McMaster University, 2010.
 Birch, Jennifer. "Coalescence and Conflict in Iroquoian Ontario," Archeological Review from Cambridge 25, no. 1 (2010), 29–48.
 Bowman, Irene. "The Draper Site: White Pine Succession on an Abandoned Late Prehistoric Iroquoian Maize Field." North Pickering Archaeology, Part II (1974), 54–85.
 Dodd, Christine F. "Ontario Iroquois Tradition Longhouses." M.A. Thesis, Simon Fraser University. Burnaby, BC, 1982. (Search "Draper").
 Finlayson, William D. The 1975 and 1978 Rescue Excavations at the Draper Site: Introductions and Settlements. Ottawa: National Museum of Man, 1985.
 Hayden, Brian, ed. Settlement Patterns of the Draper and White Sites: 1973 Excavations. Burnaby, BC: Archaeology Press Simon Fraser University, 1979.
 Sioui, Georges E. Wendat: The Heritage of the Circle. Trans. J. Brierley. Vancouver, BC: UBC Press, 1999.
 Trigger, Bruce G.  Natives and Newcomers: Canada's Heroic Age Reconsidered. Montreal: McGill-Queen's University Press, 1985. Pp. 72, 101, 103, 151, 215, 220.
 Warrick, Gary A. "Reconstructing Ontario Iroquoian Village Organization," M.A. Thesis, Simon Fraser University. Burnaby, BC, 1983.
 Warrick, Gary A. "A Population History of the Huron-Petun, A.D. 900-1650," PhD Thesis, McGill University. Montreal, PQ, 1990 (revised edition published as  A Population History of the Huron-Petun, A.D. 500-1650. New York: Cambridge University Press, 2008).
 Warrick, Gary A. "The Precontact Iroquoian Occupation of Southern Ontario." In Jorden E. Kerber, ed., Archaeology of the Iroquois: selected readings and research sources, ch. 7, pp. 124–164. Syracuse, NY: Syracuse University Press, 2007.
 Williamson, Ronald. ""'Otinontsiskiaj ondoan (The House of Cut-off Heads): The History and Archaeology of Northern Iroquoian Trophy Taking." In The Taking and Displaying of Human Body Parts as Trophies by Amerindians, 190–221. Ed. Richard J. Chacon and David H. Dye. New York: Springer, 2007 (esp. pp 210–212).

External links
 The Huron-Wendat Museum, Wendake, Quebec
 Huron-Wendat Nation, Wendake, Quebec.
 Pickering Public Library, Archaeological Artifacts from Pickering Sites.
 Konrad, V. Map: Known Archaeological Sites in the North Pickering Community, March 1973.

References

Iroquois populated places
Archaeological sites in Ontario
First Nations history in Ontario
Wyandot
Buildings and structures in the Regional Municipality of Durham
16th century in Ontario
Woodland period sites in Canada